Copernicia gigas is a palm which is endemic to eastern Cuba.

References

gigas
Trees of Cuba
Vulnerable plants
Taxa named by Max Burret